César Alejandro Ríos Muñóz (born December 1, 1983, in Vista Hermosa, Michoacán) is a former professional Mexican footballer who last played for León.

External links
 

Living people
1983 births
Association football goalkeepers
Club León footballers
Altamira F.C. players
Correcaminos UAT footballers
C.F. Mérida footballers
Liga MX players
Ascenso MX players
Footballers from Michoacán
Mexican footballers